Mohammed Abdelhak Zakaria (born Abdelhaq El Gourch on 20 July 1974) is a retired Moroccan-Bahraini long-distance runner. He switched nationality from his birth country of Morocco.

Achievements

Personal bests
3000 metres - 7:40.16 min (1998)
5000 metres - 13:18.19 min (2003)
10,000 metres - 28:07.9 min (1999)
Half marathon - 1:01:24 hrs (2006)
Marathon - 2:11:49 hrs (2006)

References
 

1974 births
Living people
Bahraini male long-distance runners
Moroccan male long-distance runners
Moroccan male marathon runners
Olympic athletes of Bahrain
Athletes (track and field) at the 2004 Summer Olympics
Athletes (track and field) at the 2008 Summer Olympics
Asian Games medalists in athletics (track and field)
Athletes (track and field) at the 2002 Asian Games
Athletes (track and field) at the 2006 Asian Games
Asian Games silver medalists for Bahrain
Asian Games bronze medalists for Bahrain
Medalists at the 2002 Asian Games